Alitagtag, officially the Municipality of Alitagtag,  is a 4th class municipality in the province of Batangas, Philippines. According to the 2020 census, it has a population of 26,819 people.

Geography

According to the Philippine Statistics Authority, the municipality has a land area of  constituting  of the  total area of Batangas.

It is bordered on the north by Taal Lake, east by Cuenca and San Jose, west by Santa Teresita and San Luis, and south by Bauan and San Pascual.

Barangays
Alitagtag is politically subdivided into 19 barangays. In 1957, the following barrios were created: Pingas, composed of Sitios Pingas and Corral; Tadlak, composed of sitios Tadlak and Malukan; and Sambi composed of the sitio of Sambi.

Climate

Demographics

In the 2020 census, Alitagtag had a population of 26,819.

Economy

Tourism

The town is notable for being the original location where a replica of the True Cross was erected in the Spanish Era. Known as the "Holy Cross of Alitagtag", the image which was supposedly hewn from the post of a fallen house made of anubing (a hardwood), is venerated in surrounding towns for its allegedly mystical powers.

The Sublî dance, now popular throughout the province and beyond, is the most widely recognised ritual associated with the Catholic devotion to the Holy Cross of Alitagtag.

Gallery

References

External links

[ Philippine Standard Geographic Code]

Municipalities of Batangas
Populated places on Taal Lake